Kelvin Steven Langmead (born 23 March 1985) is an English professional footballer who plays for Banbury United. He began his career as a striker, but since September 2006 has been employed as a central defender, most notably for Shrewsbury Town and Northampton Town.

Career

Preston North End
Langmead began his career as a trainee at Preston North End. He spent a month on loan to Tamworth in the Football Conference, where he played two matches in September 2003.

Later in the same season Preston loaned him to then Division 3 club Carlisle. He played 11 matches, with his league début coming in a 4–1 defeat at Torquay on 6 March 2004. His first goal was at Mansfield in a 3–2 win on 24 April.

In September 2004 Langmead was again sent out on loan, this time to Kidderminster Harriers in the newly named League Two. He played 11 matches for the Harriers and scored one goal. He returned to Preston to make his only appearance for the club, coming on as a substitute in the Championship game against Millwall (1–1, 13 November 2004).

Shrewsbury Town
Two weeks after his Preston début, he debuted for Shrewsbury, shortly after the appointment of former Preston manager and youth development chief Gary Peters as Shrews manager. Langmead played just three matches for the Shropshire club (scoring one goal) before making the move a permanent one, signing on a free transfer.

Langmead then made more than 80 appearances in League Two for Shrewsbury as a striker, and although far from prolific, he improved his scoring rate. In September 2006, after noticing his aerial ability when defending corners, Gary Peters trialled him at centre-back in a reserve fixture. He was then utilised in this position for the first team, and was recognised in the League Two team of the week for his performance against Macclesfield Town on 6 October 2006. Langmead's success in this position saw him play out the rest of the season at centre-back, as Shrewsbury reached the League Two play-off final. Langmead also earned the Player of the Season award as voted for by both players and fans, for his consistency that term.

The following season, Salop's first at the New Meadow was not quite as successful for Langmead. With frequent changes of central defensive partner, his form suffered somewhat. He missed the final seven games of the season due to an operation on an injured knee, but returned to fitness in time for the start of pre-season training.

At the start of the 2008–09 season, Langmead struggled to gain a place in the first team, as Paul Simpson preferred a central defensive partnership of Mike Jackson and Graham Coughlan. However, in the latter half of the campaign he regained a regular place, playing alongside Coughlan at the heart of the defence. The season ended in heartache for Langmead as Shrewsbury lost in the League Two play-off final for the second time in three years. In June 2009 he signed a new two-year contract.

Peterborough United
On 24 June 2010, he was sold to Peterborough United on a three-year deal for an undisclosed fee.
On 7 August 2010, he made his debut in a convincing 3–0 home win over Bristol Rovers.
He was virtually ever present for Peterborough United under Gary Johnson, however he fell out of favour under new manager Darren Ferguson, who preferred to partner Ryan Bennett and Gabriel Zakuani at centre-back.

Northampton Town
On 9 August 2011, he re-joined former Peterborough United manager Gary Johnson at League Two club Northampton Town on a one-month loan.
Later that day, he made his debut for Northampton Town in a shock 2–1 win over Championship side Ipswich Town at Portman Road in the League Cup first round. He came off the bench to replace Bas Savage in stoppage time.

Non-league
After his release from Northampton, Langmead dropped into non-league football. After a spell at Ebbsfleet United, then a season-long loan at Kidderminster Harriers, he joined Nuneaton Town in summer 2016. In July 2018, Langmead joined Harrogate Town on a free transfer, before leaving them to join Brackley Town. His most recent move was a move in August 2020 to Banbury United. Langmead scored two goals for them on 28th July 2023 against Hereford in a 3-2 win for Banbury.

Career statistics

References

External links
Kelvin Langmead profile at ntfc.co.uk

1985 births
Living people
Footballers from Coventry
English footballers
Association football defenders
Association football forwards
Preston North End F.C. players
Tamworth F.C. players
Carlisle United F.C. players
Kidderminster Harriers F.C. players
Shrewsbury Town F.C. players
Peterborough United F.C. players
Northampton Town F.C. players
Ebbsfleet United F.C. players
Nuneaton Borough F.C. players
Harrogate Town A.F.C. players
Brackley Town F.C. players
Banbury United F.C. players
English Football League players
National League (English football) players